Richard Brian Ferguson (born 1951) is an American anthropologist.  He is an authority on warfare.

Life 
Richard Brian Ferguson was born in New York, New York on July 19, 1951.  He spent his childhood in upstate New York.

Ferguson attended Columbia University, graduating with a bachelor's degree in anthropology in 1974.  During this time he was involved in activism opposing the Vietnam war. He earned his doctorate in anthropology from Columbia University in 1988, with  dissertation field work in Puerto Rico.

Career 
Ferguson is now a tenured professor of Anthropology at Rutgers University Newark.  His expertise lies in cultural anthropology, the anthropology of war, ethnic conflict, state-tribe interaction, policing, and Puerto Rico.  He is part of the Department of Sociology and Anthropology as well as Global Urban Studies/Urban Systems.  He has also served on the board of governors of the New York Academy of Sciences. Ferguson has published many papers critical of biological perspectives in anthropology, especially explanations of war.

Publications 
 The Anthropology of War (with Leslie Farragher) (1988)
 Explaining War (1990)
 Infrastructural Determinism (1995)
 When Worlds Collide (1992)
 A Paradigm for the Study of War and Society (1999)
 Violent Conflict and Control of the State (2003)
 Archaeology, Cultural Anthropology, and the Origins and Intensification  of War (2006)
 War Before History (2008)
 Ten Points on War (2008)

References

1951 births
Living people
American anthropologists
Columbia College (New York) alumni
Rutgers University faculty